Bartosz Marcin Cybulski (born 15 October 2002) is a Polish professional footballer who plays as a forward for AFC Fylde on loan from Derby County.

Club career
Cybulski made his debut for Derby County as a substitute in a 2–0 FA Cup loss to Chorley on 9 January 2021. He was one of fourteen players from Derby County's academy to make their debut in the game, after the entirety of Derby's first team squad and coaching team were forced to isolate due to a COVID-19 outbreak. He made his league debut as a substitute in a 1–0 win against Peterborough United on 19 February 2022.

On 14 October 2022, he joined Northern Premier League Premier Division side Matlock Town on loan.

On 2 December 2022, he joined National League side Solihull Moors on a one-month loan. He joined National League North leaders AFC Fylde on 17 March 2023, on loan until the end of the season.

International career
Cybulski was born in Poland and moved to the British Isles at the age of 4. He has been called up by Poland at U19 level.

Career statistics

References

2002 births
Living people
Polish footballers
Poland youth international footballers
Association football forwards
Derby County F.C. players
Matlock Town F.C. players
Solihull Moors F.C. players
AFC Fylde players
Northern Premier League players
English Football League players
National League (English football) players
Polish expatriate footballers
Expatriate footballers in England
Polish expatriate sportspeople in England